Thomas Upton Sisson (September 22, 1869 – September 26, 1923) was a U.S. Representative from Mississippi.

Biography

Early life
Thomas U. Sisson was born on September 22, 1869 near McCool, Attala County, Mississippi. He moved with his father to Choctaw County, Mississippi. He attended the common schools and the French Camp Academy, Mississippi. He graduated from the Southwestern Presbyterian University, now known as Rhodes College, in Clarksville, Tennessee in 1889. He then studied law at the University of Mississippi in Oxford, Mississippi and was graduated from Cumberland School of Law at Cumberland University in Lebanon, Tennessee.

Career
He served as the Principal of Carthage High School in Carthage, Mississippi from 1889 to 1890. He then served as Principal of the graded schools in Kosciusko, Mississippi from 1890 to 1892.

He was admitted to the bar in Memphis, Tennessee in 1894 and began practicing the Law in Winona, Mississippi. He served as a member of the Mississippi State Senate in 1898. He then served as district attorney of the fifth judicial district from 1903 to 1907.

He served as a Democratic member of the United States House of Representatives from March 4, 1909 to March 3, 1923. He was an unsuccessful candidate for reelection in 1922 to the sixty-eighth Congress.

Death
He died on September 26, 1923 in Washington, D.C. He was buried at the Oak Hill Cemetery in Winona, Mississippi.

References

External links 
 

1869 births
1923 deaths
People from Attala County, Mississippi
Rhodes College alumni
Cumberland University alumni
University of Mississippi alumni
Mississippi lawyers
Democratic Party Mississippi state senators
Democratic Party members of the United States House of Representatives from Mississippi
People from Winona, Mississippi
French Camp Academy
19th-century American lawyers